Kräuterlikör  (herbal liqueur or spiced liqueur, also called "half-bitters") is a type of liqueur that is flavored with herbs or spices and traditionally drunk neat as a digestif, very close to the concept of an italian amaro.

The history of Kräuterlikör recipes dates back to medieval authors like Hildegard of Bingen. Mixtures of alcohol and bitter substances were used as medicine to increase bile and gastric acid secretion; however, the higher proportion of alcohol and sugar is not conducive to digestion. Nowadays, Kräuterlikör is also served as an ingredient of different cocktails and long drinks.

Widely sold liqueur brands are Riga Black Balsam, Jägermeister, Killepitsch, Kuemmerling, Schierker Feuerstein, Schwartzhog, Wurzelpeter, and Underberg (Germany), Altvater (Austria), Becherovka (Czech Republic), Unicum (Hungary), as well as Bénédictine and Chartreuse (France). In Italy, amaro ("bitter") liqueurs include Cynar and Ramazzotti.

See also
Fernet
Gorki List
Schnapps

References

German distilled drinks
Herbal liqueurs